The Motor Cavaliers (Swedish: Motorkavaljerer) is a 1950 Swedish comedy sports film directed by Elof Ahrle and starring Åke Söderblom, Viveca Serlachius and Sten Gester. It was shot at the Centrumateljéerna Studios in Stockholm. The film's sets were designed by the art director P.A. Lundgren.

Synopsis
A shop assistant becomes an unlikely motorcycle speedway star after he agrees to substitute for his friend who actually drove the winning bike. After trying to escape publicity he heads to the countryside, but returns to take part in a major race which he himself really wins this time. He also wins the affections of the daughter of his employer.

Cast
 Åke Söderblom as 	Åke Svärd
 Viveca Serlachius as 	Maj
 Elof Ahrle as Pelle Greiberg
 Gunilla Klosterborg as 	Gun Wall
 Sten Gester as 	Olle Eggert
 Sigge Fürst as Radio Speaker
 Rut Holm as 	Augusta Klang
 Stig Järrel as 	Major Eggert
 Emmy Albiin as 	Johanna
 Harriet Andersson as Waitress
 Wiktor Andersson as Gardener
 Sven-Axel Carlsson as 	Moje
 Siegfried Fischer as 	Taxi driver
 Carl-Gustaf Lindstedt as 	Shirt salesman
 John Melin as 	Man in audience
 Gunilla Pontén as Bathing beauty
 Olav Riégo as 	Mr. Wall, Gun's father
 Hanny Schedin as 	Mrs. Pettersson
 Georg Skarstedt as Man
 Katarina Taikon as Bathing beauty
 Rose-Marie Taikon as Bathing beauty
 Alf Östlund as 	Jonas Kvist

References

Bibliography 
 Qvist, Per Olov & von Bagh, Peter. Guide to the Cinema of Sweden and Finland. Greenwood Publishing Group, 2000.
Segrave, Kerry & Martin, Linda.  The Continental Actress: European Film Stars of the Postwar Era--biographies, Criticism, Filmographies, Bibliographies. McFarland, 1990.

External links 
 

1950 films
Swedish sports films
1950s sports films
Swedish comedy films
1950 comedy films
1950s Swedish-language films
Films directed by Elof Ahrle
Motorcycle racing films
Films set in Stockholm
1950s Swedish films